Kaymu is an online marketplace founded in 2013, providing localized C2C and B2C products in Africa, Europe and Asia. The platform lets buyers and sellers meet to make deals on new and used fashion items, mobile phones, jewelry, and home appliances.

History
Kaymu initially launched in Nigeria and Pakistan in January 2013 and within 27 months opened operations in 32 other countries. Kaymu copies eBay's model; it does not offer first-party product sales, and it has separate retail websites for each of the countries it operates in. Kaymu's closest competitor is Naspers-owned OLX who have operations in over 100 countries and run a C2C model.

In January 2013, Kaymu received an undisclosed amount in seed funding from Rocket Internet and began operations in Nigeria and Pakistan. Kaymu grew from an employee base of 10 to 60 in nine months and opened operations in Ghana and Morocco in October 2013, before expanding to other emerging economies in its second year of operation.

As at June 2015, Kaymu's operations have grown to include Mozambique, Bangladesh, Nepal, Myanmar, Slovenia, Sri Lanka, Bulgaria, Uzbekistan, and Philippines. Kaymu operates in 35 countries, 17 of which are in Africa, and the rest in Europe and Asia.

Kaymu currently has operations in the following regions & countries: 
 Africa: Algeria, Angola, Cameroon, Ethiopia, Gabon, Ghana, Ivory Coast, Kenya, Morocco, Mozambique, Nigeria, Rwanda, Senegal, Tanzania, Tunisia, Uganda & Zambia
 Asia and Middle East: Azerbaijan, Bangladesh, Cambodia, Myanmar, Nepal, Pakistan, Philippines, Saudi Arabia & Uzbekistan
 Europe: Albania, Bosnia Herzegovina, Bulgaria, Belarus, Croatia, Georgia, Slovakia & Slovenia

In 2016, Kaymu turned into Jumia in Africa.

Investors
Kaymu is backed by a Nepalese Citizen Rajib Kumar Mehta, under the umbrella of the  Jumia Group conglomerate. Rocket Internet CEO Oliver Samwer has described his company as a platform that builds internet companies rather than as investors, innovators or startup incubators as they are perceived by others. Rocket Internet oversees all of its business affairs in Africa through Africa Internet Group which has shared ownership among Rocket Internet, MTN and Millicom.

Controversy
Kaymu, like other startups that belong to the list of companies backed by Rocket Internet, has been criticized for its copy-and-paste model. Rocket Internet takes business models that have succeeded in Europe and the U.S. and clones them in emerging economies. Kaymu is one of such models, and has been described to copy the eBay model.

Awards
Online Retail Award (London, 2014)

References

External links

Online marketplaces of Nigeria
Retail companies established in 2013
Internet properties established in 2013
Rocket Internet